Mace is an unincorporated community in Walnut Township, Montgomery County, in the U.S. state of Indiana.

History
Mace, formerly called Fredericksburg, was laid out in about 1840 by Frederick Long. A post office was established at Mace in 1853, and remained in operation until it was discontinued in 1912.

Geography

References

Gallery

Unincorporated communities in Montgomery County, Indiana
Unincorporated communities in Indiana